Marshall Frederick Rosen (born 17 September 1948 in Paddington, Sydney, New South Wales, Australia), is a former cricket player for New South Wales, and a member of the NSW Cricket Association Board.

Cricket career
Rosen represented New South Wales between 1971 and 1975 as an opening batsman. He was a representative in Sheffield Shield Cricket, the highest form of Australian national competition.

In 2007 Rosen, who is Jewish, was inducted into the Maccabi NSW Hall of Fame.

Rosen was elected a State Selector in 2002, and was elected as a Director of the NSW Cricket Association Board in 2005.

Personal life
Rosen graduated from the University of NSW in 1973. He is a Managing Director of his own construction business, Riboni Group of Companies.

See also
List of select Jewish cricketers
List of New South Wales representative cricketers

References

External links
Rosen's batting, fielding, and bowling averages
Rosen's Cricket Archives statistics

1948 births
Living people
New South Wales cricketers
Cricketers from Sydney
Jewish cricketers
Australian cricketers
Jewish Australian sportspeople